Brian Baker is an American football coach, former Linebacker, and former defensive line coach for the Indianapolis Colts. He had been coaching for over 30 years in football both college and the NFL prior to his joining the Colts.

Playing career 
A Baltimore native, Brian played outside linebacker for the Maryland Terrapins between 1980 and their ACC championship in 1983. During his time there, he was teammates with Boomer Esiason and Frank Reich. In 1984, he spent his time working as a student assistant for the Terps. In 1985, he earned a degree in marketing while serving as a graduate assistant.

Coaching career
After the two years coaching at his alma mater Baker went to Army where he served as the running backs coach for 1986. Following his year at Army Baker coached linebackers at Georgia Tech for nine years. In 1995 he added the defensive coordinator. In 1996 he made the leap to the NFL coaching the defensive line coach of the San Diego Chargers as a part of his Maryland head coach Bobby Ross' staff. He left the Chargers with Ross to join the Lions in 1997 coaching the same position, he would stay with Detroit for 4 years of Ross’ tenure. For the next five years he would coach for the Minnesota Vikings spending three as a defensive line coach and two coaching linebackers. From 2006 to 2008 Baker served as the defensive line coach for the St. Louis Rams. From 2009 to 2010, Baker coached the defensive line coach for the Panthers. For the next two seasons Baker served as the defensive line coach for the Dallas Cowboys. During his time there, he worked with three Pro Bowlers, DeMarcus Ware, Jay Ratliff, and Anthony Spencer. In 2013 Baker was the outside linebackers coach for the Browns.In 2014 he worked as the outside linebackers coach for the Washington Redskins. In 2015 he worked as an assistant Texas high school football coach. From 2016 to 2018 he was the defensive line coach for Mississippi State. In 2019 he worked as Alabama’s defensive line coach under Nick Saban. In 2020 he returned to the NFL as the defensive line coach for the Colts under Frank Reich.

Personal life 
Baker and his wife, Nevada, have four daughters, Norell, Nicole, Jade and Jasmine

References 

Living people
20th-century African-American sportspeople
21st-century African-American people
African-American coaches of American football
African-American players of American football
Alabama Crimson Tide football coaches
American football linebackers
Army Black Knights football coaches
Carolina Panthers coaches
Cleveland Browns coaches
Dallas Cowboys coaches
Detroit Lions coaches
Georgia Tech Yellow Jackets football coaches
Indianapolis Colts coaches
Maryland Terrapins football coaches
Maryland Terrapins football players
Minnesota Vikings coaches
Mississippi State Bulldogs football coaches
San Diego Chargers coaches
Players of American football from Baltimore
St. Louis Rams coaches
Washington Redskins coaches
Year of birth missing (living people)